Tyler Laubscher (born 18 December 2000) is a New Zealand rugby union player who plays for the  in Super Rugby. His playing position is flanker. He was named in the Hurricanes squad for the 2022 Super Rugby Pacific season. He was also a member of the  2021 Bunnings NPC squad.

References

External links
itsrugby.co.uk profile

2000 births
New Zealand rugby union players
Living people
Rugby union flankers
Manawatu rugby union players
Hurricanes (rugby union) players